Kevin Wade Campbell is an American former professional baseball player. He played as a right-handed pitcher in Major League Baseball from 1991 to 1995 for the Oakland Athletics and the Minnesota Twins.

Campbell attended the University of Arkansas, and in 1984 he played collegiate summer baseball with the Cotuit Kettleers of the Cape Cod Baseball League. He earned a win in the 1986 College World Series. That June, he was drafted by the Los Angeles Dodgers in the 5th round of the 1986 amateur draft. After spending five seasons in their organization, the Dodgers traded him to the Athletics prior to the 1991 season.

References

External links

Major League Baseball pitchers
Oakland Athletics players
Minnesota Twins players
Great Falls Dodgers players
Vero Beach Dodgers players
Bakersfield Dodgers players
San Antonio Missions players
Tacoma Tigers players
Salt Lake Buzz players
Tacoma Rainiers players
Cotuit Kettleers players
Baseball players from Arkansas
1964 births
Living people
People from Marianna, Arkansas